The Negheriting Shiva Doul(নেঘেৰিটিং শিৱ দৌল ) is a Shiva temple at Dergaon in Assam, India. Situated on a hillock at about one and half km north from the National Highway 37 in the Golaghat district of Assam, the temple was first constructed by the Dimasa Kacharis during 8th – 9th century AD. Later due to natural calamities it came into destruction. In 1765 it was re-constructed by Ahom king Swargadeo Rajeswar Singha. The famous architect assigned to the job was Ghanashyam Khonikar.

History
It is believed that the stones used to construct the temple were existed in the bank of river Dihing. Due to natural calamities the temple was destroyed and the remains were found in deep forest called Gajapanemara. However, as the Dihing river changed the course, the temple was again destroyed and merged into the river water. A devotee of lord Shiva found the ruined temple and the linga in the shallow water of river Dihing, now this place is known as Sheetal Negheri. Ahom king Rajeswar Singha (1751–1769) brought the linga from the river and reconstructed the present temple and established the Shivalinga in it.

Architecture
The main temple is surrounded by four other temples namely the Vishnu, Ganesha, Surya and Durga temple. A Banalinga of 3 feet in diameter is established in the main temple. According to legend a Rishi named Urba wanted to establish a second Kashi right on this place for which he collected many Shiva lingas there.

The name
The place where the temple is located was once the habitat of a peculiar bird locally known as Negheri. From this name the place has come to be known as Negheriting.

Maintenance
A priest named Bhudhar Agamacharji was appointed by king Rajeswar Singha for proper maintenance of the temple and also for the rituals to be performed. The Agamacharji family still performs worship and other maintenance works regularly. Customs of performing songs and dances called Deonati were prominent there in the temple.

The Monkeys
One of the attractions of the temple is the monkeys. The temple is the house of the rhesus monkeys where a sizeable population of this species is there.

Photo gallery

References

Hindu temples in Assam
Shiva temples in Assam
Golaghat district